Tobiasz Musielak (born 18 August 1993 in Leszno, Poland) is a Polish motorcycle speedway rider who rode for the Wolverhampton Wolves in the Elite League and has also ridden for Swindon Robins and Sheffield Tigers.

Career
Musielak, the younger brother of fellow Speedway rider Sławomir Musielak,  mirrored the early career of his brother by starting his career with Unia Leszno who Tobiasz still rides for today after first riding for them in 2009. In 2011 he became a member of the Polish national junior speedway team, and in 2012 he was the runner-up in the Individual Speedway Junior European Championship.

Musielak was given his first opportunity in British Speedway by the Wolverhampton Wolves who named him in their 2015 line-up. Wolves promoter Chris Van Straaten described Musielak as "a really entertaining rider and a really exciting prospect". He rode with Swindon Robins in 2017 when they became SGB Premiership champions, but did not ride in the UK in 2018. He returned for 2019, winning a second SGB Premiership with the Robins.

In 2022, he rode for the Sheffield Tigers in the SGB Premiership 2022. He helped Sheffield win the League cup and reach the Play off final. Also in 2022, he helped Wilki Krosno win the 2022 1.Liga.

He signed again for Sheffield for the SGB Premiership 2023.

References

Polish speedway riders
1993 births
Living people
Sheffield Tigers riders
Swindon Robins riders
Wolverhampton Wolves riders
People from Leszno
Sportspeople from Greater Poland Voivodeship